Zuger is a surname. Notable people with the surname include:

Joe Zuger (born 1940), American and Canadian football player

See also
Zuger Kantonalbank, bank based in Switzerland
Zuger Kirschtorte, layer cake from Switzerland
Zuger See, lake in Switzerland